La Nazione Albanese ("The Albanian Nation") was a newspaper of the Arbereshe community of Italy during end of 19th-century and early 20th-century. It covered political, socio-cultural, and informative functions toward the Arbereshe community and Albanians in general. It also covered thematics such as the Albanian National Awakening and state-forming, Italian-Albanian relationships, as well as political events of a broader spectrum. It was founded and managed by Italian lawyer and publicist Anselmo Lorecchio, an Arbereshe from Pallagorio, Calabria. It published articles from Albanian writers and publicists as well.

History
The Società Nazionale Albanese (Albanian National Society) was founded in 1895 out of an Arberesh congress held in Corigliano Calabro and led by scholar Girolamo De Rada. Lorecchio would become head of the society in February 1897, during the second congress held in Lungro. Just a few weeks before La Nazione Albanese had already started publishing and served from that moment on as a press organ of the society, although its official newspaper remained Ylli i Arbëreshëve ("The star of the Arbereshe") published in Corigliano Calabro.

On 18 April 1900, the Società Nazionale Albanese transformed into Comitato Nazionale Albanese (Albanian National Committee) and the headquarters were transferred to Rome. The newspaper moved as well and was published there since then, printed in "Tipografia Dante Alighieri".
The death of Lorecchio in 1924 brought the newspaper as well to an end.

Importance

References

Newspapers published in Italy
Newspapers published in Rome
Albanian-language newspapers
Italian-language newspapers
Publications disestablished in 1924
Publications established in 1897
Albanian National Awakening